Mary Carvellas (May 3, 1924 – October 18, 2013), better known as Mary Carver, was an American actress whose career spanned more than 60 years. She may be best known for her role as matriarch Cecilia Simon on the series Simon & Simon appearing in 153 episodes from 1981 to 1989 over eight seasons.

Early life
Carver was born in Los Angeles, the daughter of John and Carmen (née Delmar) Carvellas. Carver graduated from Hollywood High School and City College.

Career
Carver appeared in the Broadway production of Out West of Eighth in 1951. She appeared on Broadway in The Shadow Box in 1977 and in Fifth of July during the 1980s.

Her films included From Here to Eternity (1953), Pay or Die (1960), I Never Promised You a Rose Garden (1977), Protocol (1984), Best Seller (1987), Arachnophobia (1990), and Safe (1995).

Her television roles included Simon & Simon, The Donna Reed Show, ER, The Guardian, Gunsmoke (1956 title character-“Anne” - in “Chester’s Mail Order Bride” - S1E34), Lou Grant, Lux Video Theatre, The Man from U.N.C.L.E., Mannix, Mary Hartman, Mary Hartman, McCloud, Quincy, M.E., The Rockford Files, Star Trek: Enterprise, and The Twilight Zone.

In addition to acting, Carver taught within the theater department of the University of Southern California.

Personal life
Carver married film director Joseph Sargent in 1952. They had two daughters, Athena Sargent and voice actress Lia Sargent, and divorced in 1968.

Death
Carver died on October 18, 2013, following a brief illness at her home in Woodland Hills, California. She was 89 years old. She was survived by her daughters.

Filmography

References

External links

1924 births
2013 deaths
American television actresses
American film actresses
American stage actresses
Actresses from Los Angeles
University of Southern California faculty
People from Woodland Hills, Los Angeles
20th-century American actresses
21st-century American actresses
American women academics